Saren may refer to:

 Saren Arterius, a fictional character in the Mass Effect video game franchise
 , a type of blood sausage of Java, Indonesia
 Ilkka Sarén (1940-2022), Finnish chess master
 Uma Saren (born 1984), Indian politician

See also 
 Sarens
 Saran (disambiguation)
 Sarin (disambiguation)